is a Japanese voice actress from Kagoshima Prefecture.

Career
Aoba worked with Rock 'n' Banana until 1 July 2013.

Video game voice work

2011
Euphoria – Nemu Manaka

2013
Gensou no Idea: Oratorio Phantasm Historia – Kanzaki Noel
Hapymaher – Hirasaka Keiko [84]
Nanay happy Princess – Hibiki wood Otowa
Baldo sky zero – Murrell
Brides love – Cherry Yuki Mori Misaki
Naimononedari are you sister – Ayaka 七々原
The sunny nostalgia CA – Bird Yu Kei
Love in bloom, a promise of love ~ Annaffiare ~ – Mind the hangjin road
Us «and» to starry sky «sky» is round – Nirehara cheer sounds
Vlaomote of my girlfriend-Pure Sweet Heart ~ – 鳴ヶ崎 Kanna
By Akuma oshioki!! round Kido Thad expression hentai punishment Department – Corona
Three pole Princess 3-World newborn- – Scripture Wei, Kanu
Against polar Princess 5-genealogy of the King cut off the ravages of war- – Uesugi Kenshin, Honda tadakatsu, Tachibana dōsetsu

Filmography
Harukazedori ni Tomarigi o (2007) – Kanome Urashima
Shin Koihime Musō (2007) – Batai (Tanpopo)
Chōkō Sennin Haruka (2008) – Narika Shihōdō
Love Selection (2008) – Yayoi
Sakura Strasse (2008) – Christof Clement
Sengoku Hime (2008) – Tachibana Dousetsu
Honō no Haramase Dōkyūsei (2008-2009) – Mai Ebihara, Nanoha Homura
Flyable Heart (2009) – Megumi Hayakawa
Hana to Otome ni Shukufuku o (2009) – Mayako Yamamoto
Imouto Smile (2009) – Natsuki Namisawa
Sakura Tale (2009) – Lydie de Le Fehver
Ama Ane (2010) – Yuzuki Yashima
Deardrops (2010) – Sakurai Kanade
Princess Knight Catue (2010) - Catue Dragundaala [Hentai]
Fault!! (2010) – Mio Sugiyama
Hoshizora e Kakaru Hashi (2010) – Ibuki Hinata
Jinki Extend Re:vision (2010) – Satsuki Kawamoto
Kono Uta ga Owattara: When This Song Is Over (2010) – Mizuku Fujiwara
Noble Works (2010) – Maya Nagamitsu
Love Death 555! (2010) – Ichigo Takagaki
Euphoria (2011) – Nemu Manaka
fortissimo EXA//Akkord:Bsusvier (2011) – Sayuki Kurobane
Bishoujo Mangekyo: Norowareshi Densetsu no Shojo (2011) – Kirie Kagarino
Dracu-riot! (2012) – Sayo Aragami
fortissimo EXS//Akkord:nächsten Phase (2012) – Sayuki Kurobane
Love La Bride (2013) – Sakuranomori Misaki

References

External links

Living people
Japanese video game actresses
Japanese voice actresses
Voice actresses from Kagoshima Prefecture
Year of birth missing (living people)